50th meridian may refer to:

50th meridian east, a line of longitude east of the Greenwich Meridian
50th meridian west, a line of longitude west of the Greenwich Meridian